"StarRingChild" is the sixth single by Japanese singer Aimer, released on May 21, 2014 under Defstar Records. Written by Hiroyuki Sawano, the song was used as the ending theme of episode 7 of the mecha anime OVA series Mobile Suit Gundam Unicorn and episode 22 of the OVA's TV edit version Mobile Suit Gundam Unicorn RE:0096. The single peaked at No. 3 on Oricon's singles charts and No. 17 on Billboard Japan's Hot 100.

In an interview, Aimer said the song is about one's struggle from childhood to maturity. Prior to recording the song, she watched previous Gundam titles to fully understand the world of the franchise.

The song was written in English by cAnON. and re-recorded by Aimer in the 2014 SawanoHiroyuki[nZk]:Aimer collaboration album UnChild.

Track listing

CD

DVD
"StarRingChild" (Music video) - 5:25

Music video
The music video takes place in a post-apocalyptic wasteland, where a trio of children roam around the ruins of a city and pick up old toys and photographs. They discover a glowing white orb before climbing one of the skyscrapers to watch the sun rise.

Chart position

References

External links 
  (Aimer-web)
  (agehasprings)
  (Sony Music Entertainment Japan)
 "StarRingChild" on quia
 
 StarRingChild / Aimer on VGMdb

2014 singles
2014 songs
Aimer songs
Gundam songs
Defstar Records singles
Japanese-language songs